Eugenia subterminalis, commonly known as , , , , and , is a species of plant in the family Myrtaceae. It is endemic to araucária forest in Bolivia, northern Brazil, Colombia, Ecuador, and Peru. The plant is a semi-deciduous shrub that grows to between 2 and 4 metres tall, and produces egg shaped fruit between 15 and 25mm tall, and 18 to 20mm wide.

References

subterminalis
Crops originating from the Americas
Tropical fruit
Fruits originating in South America
Cauliflory
Fruit trees
Berries